In mathematics, Viennot's geometric construction (named after Xavier Gérard Viennot) gives a diagrammatic interpretation of the Robinson–Schensted correspondence in terms of shadow lines.  It has a generalization to the Robinson–Schensted–Knuth correspondence, which is known as the matrix-ball construction.

The construction
Starting with a permutation , written in two-line notation, say:

 

one can apply the Robinson–Schensted correspondence to this permutation, yielding two standard Young tableaux of the same shape, P and Q. P is obtained by performing a sequence of insertions, and Q is the recording tableau, indicating in which order the boxes were filled.

Viennot's construction starts by plotting the points  in the plane, and imagining there is a light that shines from the origin, casting shadows straight up and to the right. This allows consideration of the points which are not shadowed by any other point; the boundary of their shadows then forms the first shadow line. Removing these points and repeating the procedure, one obtains all the shadow lines for this permutation. Viennot's insight is then that these shadow lines read off the first rows of P and Q (in fact, even more than that; these shadow lines form a "timeline", indicating which elements formed the first rows of P and Q after the successive insertions). One can then repeat the construction, using as new points the previous unlabelled corners, which allows to read off the other rows of P and Q.

Animation
For example consider the permutation

 

Then Viennot's construction goes as follows:

Applications

One can use Viennot's geometric construction to prove that if  corresponds to the pair of tableaux P,Q under the Robinson–Schensted correspondence, then  corresponds to the switched pair Q,P. Indeed, taking  to  reflects Viennot's construction in the -axis, and this precisely switches the roles of P and Q.

See also
 Plactic monoid
 Jeu de taquin

References
 Bruce E. Sagan. The Symmetric Group. Springer, 2001.

Algebraic combinatorics